The following lists events that happened during 1908 in Denmark.

Incumbents
 Monarch – Frederick VIII
 Prime minister – J. C. Christensen (until 12 October), Niels Neergaard

Events

 14 June – Gefion Fountain inaugurated at Langelinie in Copenhagen.
 23 August  The Denmark expedition returns to Copenhagen.
 8 September – Former Minister of Justice Peter Adler Alberti turns himself in to the police for embezzlement of DKK 18 million (roughly DKK 1 billion as of 2006).
 19 September – Det Ny Teater opens in Copenhagen as the second largest theatre in the country.
 20 October – Skagen Museum is founded in the dining room at Brøndums Hotel in Skagen with the ambition to collect works by the Skagen Painters and raise funds for the construction of a building for their exhibition.

Undated
 Labour shortage begin to occur and the emigration to the United States almost stops.

Sports
 24 May  Boldklubben 1908 is founded.
 24 August  Thorvald Ellegaard wins gold in men's sprint at the 1908 UCI Track Cycling World Championships.

Births
 31 March – Karl Skytte, politician (d. 1986)
 12 May – Gunnar Strømvad, actor (d. 1972)
 31 May – Sigfred Johansen, actor (d. 1953)
 1 October – Herman David Koppel, composer (d. 1998)
 6 October – Bjarne Henning-Jensen, film director (d. 1995)
 22 October – Ole Monty, actor (d. 1977)
 23 October – Urban Hansen, politician, Lord Mayor of Copenhagen (d. 1986)

Deaths
 14 January – Holger Drachmann, poet, painter (born 1846)
 3 February – Ferdinand Meldahl, architect (born 1827)
 20 March – Frants Henningsen, painter (born 1850)
 27 August – Thorvald Bindesbøll, architect, designer (born 1846)
 20 October – Emil Blichfeldt, architect (born 1849)
 26 October – Lorenz Frølich, painter and graphic artist (born 1820)
 1 November –  Christian Conrad Sophus Danneskiold-Samsøe, landowner and theatre director (born 1836)
 8 November – Heinrich Hirschsprung, lawyer, businessman and patron (born 1836)

References

 
Denmark
Years of the 20th century in Denmark
1900s in Denmark
Denmark